Lambulosia is a monotypic moth genus in the family Erebidae erected by George Hampson in 1914. Its single species, Lambulosia aurantiaca, was first described by Walter Rothschild in 1912. It is found in Papua New Guinea.

References

Nudariina
Monotypic moth genera
Moths described in 1912
Moths of Oceania